What Goes On may refer to:

 What Goes On (album), a 1993 box set by The Velvet Underground
 "What Goes On" (Beatles song), 1965
 "What Goes On" (Velvet Underground song), 1969
 "What Goes On", a single by Mai Tai (band)  E. van Tijn, J. Fluitsma 1984
 "What Goes On", a song by Mobb Deep from The Safe Is Cracked